Epithemia turgida is a species from the genus Epithemia. The species was originally described by Friedrich Traugott Kützing in 1844

References

Taxa named by Friedrich Traugott Kützing
Bacillariophyceae